The Cund is a left tributary of the river Târnava Mică in Romania. It discharges into the Târnava Mică near Bernadea.

References

Rivers of Romania
Rivers of Mureș County